Giro Commercial Bank, whose full name was Giro Commercial Bank Limited, was a commercial bank in Kenya it was acquired and absorbed by I&M Holdings in 2017. It was licensed by the Central Bank of Kenya, the central bank and national banking regulator.

, the total asset base of Giro Commercial Bank was valued at approximately KSh.13.623 billion/= (US$157.67 million), with shareholders' equity of approximately KSh.2.086 billion/= (US$24.15 million). Then, the bank held KSh.11.457 billion (US$132.6 million), in customer deposits. At that time, the bank was ranked number 29 out of 43 licensed banks in Kenya.

History
The bank was established as Giro Bank Limited in 1992. In 1998, Giro Bank merged with Commercial Bank Limited, to form Giro Commercial Bank Limited. The stock of the bank is privately owned by individuals and institutions.

On September 7, 2015, I&M Holdings announced the acquisition of Giro Commercial Bank. The acquisition was finalized in March 2017 and the operations of Giro Commercial Bank were merged to that of I&M Bank Kenya.

Branch network
, the bank operated a network of branches at the following locations:

 Head Office - Giro House, Eldama Park, Nairobi
 Banda Street Branch - Hughes Building, Banda Street, Nairobi
 Industrial Area Branch - Dunga Road, Industrial Area, Nairobi
 Kisumu Branch - Giro House, Oginga Odinga Road, Kisumu
 Mombasa Branch - Pan Africa House, Moi Avenue, Mombasa
 Parklands Branch - 3rd Parklands Avenue, Ridge Court, Parklands, Nairobi
 Westlands Branch - Bandari Plaza, Woodvale Grove, Westlands, Nairobi.

See also
 CBK
 Kenya Banks
 Kenya Economy
 Kenyan shilling
 State Bank of India

References

External links
Website of Central Bank of Kenya
CBK Case Against Giro Bank Set for September 2011
SBI To Acquire Giro Commercial Bank, Indo Monex

Defunct banks of Kenya
Banks established in 1992
Companies based in Nairobi
Kenyan companies established in 1992